Janet: Live in Hawaii is a video released by American R&B/pop singer Janet Jackson.

Release information
Recorded on February 16, 2002, the final date of the All for You Tour at the Aloha Stadium in Hawaii, it was televised live on February 17, 2002, on HBO, and was Jackson's second concert appearance with the cable channel. The program attracted approximately 12 million viewers.

During the performance of "Would You Mind?", Jackson picks an unsuspecting member of the audience onto stage and teases them with her performance, as seen in the full-length bonus feature. Missy Elliott makes a guest performance for "Son of a Gun". The video also contains behind the scenes look at Jackson backstage during the long breaks between songs.

The video was released on June 17, 2002, in the UK and September 3, 2002, in the U.S., and was nominated for an Emmy Award in 2002 for Outstanding Multi-Camera Picture Editing for a Miniseries, Movie or a Special. It was released on July 28, 2002, in Australia where it debuted in the number two place before moving to number one the same week.
 
It was repackaged with The Velvet Rope Tour – Live in Concert video and re-released as a double disc set in the US and Europe on November 14, 2004, and again in Europe with a different cover in 2005.

Track listing

Certifications

Release history
Live in Hawaii

Live in Hawaii/The Velvet Rope Tour

References

2002 video albums
Janet Jackson video albums
Virgin Records video albums